A dolly zoom (also known as a Hitchcock shot, Vertigo shot, Jaws effect,

In general, the dolly zoom effect can be broken down into three main components: The moving direction of the camera, the dolly speed, and the camera lens' focal length. The effect is achieved by zooming a zoom lens to adjust the angle of view (often referred to as field of view, or FOV) while the camera dollies (moves) toward or away from the subject in such a way as to keep the subject the same size in the frame throughout. The zoom shifts from a wide-angle view into a more tighter-packed angle. In its classic form, the camera angle is pulled away from a subject while the lens zooms in, or vice versa. The dolly zoom's switch in lenses can help audiences identify the visual difference between wide-angle lenses and telephoto lenses. Thus, during the zoom, there is a continuous perspective distortion, the most directly noticeable feature being that the background appears to change size relative to the subject.

The visual appearance for the viewer is that either the background suddenly grows in size and detail and overwhelms the foreground, or the foreground becomes immense and dominates its previous setting, depending on which way the dolly zoom is executed. As the human visual system uses both size and perspective cues to judge the relative sizes of objects, seeing a perspective change without a size change is a highly unsettling effect, often with strong emotional impact.

History
The effect was first conceived by Alfred Hitchcock during the filming of 1940's Rebecca, but he was unable to achieve the desired results. Some 18 years later, success came through Irmin Roberts, a Paramount second-unit cameraman, who devised the proper method for Hitchcock's film Vertigo. It is thought that Alfred Hitchcock specifically asked Roberts to assist him in creating a shot that exemplifies being in a drunk state after fainting at a party. At the time, Roberts had already designed a special camera capable of fast focal lens changes that allowed short range projections. His expertise in focal lenses most likely attributed to the creation of the dolly zoom, which at the time was more popularly recognized as the "trombone shot" or "contra zoom." Despite this miraculous step forward for cinematography, Roberts was not properly credited at the end of Vertigo. However, this shot has since been used in many other films, including Goodfellas, Jaws, and the Lord of the Rings films. Rainer Werner Fassbinder uses the effect twice in one shot in Chinese Roulette (1976). Director Joe Dante referred to it as the "Jaws Shot" since the scene in Jaws, when Roy Scheider sees the shark attack of the little boy Alex, is the most famous use of this shot.

Uses 

The dolly zoom is commonly used by filmmakers to represent the sensation of vertigo, a "falling-away-from-oneself feeling" or a feeling of unreality, or to suggest that a character is undergoing a realization that causes them to reassess everything they had previously believed. The dolly zoom’s amplification of emotion is a special effect that compliments a director’s arsenal of creativity. For example, in Sam Raimi’s The Quick and the Dead, a dolly zoom, coupled with a Dutch angle shot, exemplifies drama between an intense shootout. An uneasy feeling of suspense can also be signified through a dolly zoom, most notably used in the movie Split in 2018, where Casey Cooke peers off into the distant in unwanted curiosity. Other uses include demonstrating overwhelming fear or important epiphanies in a character .  The dolly zoom can also be utilized for the purposes of tonal shifts within the film. This was most exemplified in The Lord of the Rings: The Fellowship of the Ring, where director Peter Jackson, chained events together with more flare opposed to a regular transition. Directors may also decide to use the dolly zoom as an alternative to the generic wide shot in order to give sufficient exposition on the upcoming scene . 

Among the many creative uses the dolly zoom can provide to cinematographers, the shot can generally be divided into two types: the dolly-in/zoom-out and the dolly-out/zoom-in. The dolly-in/zoom-out shot is usually centered on a subject, where the background is pushed away from the character to create a profuse amount of uneasiness. For example, the movie Poltergeist's infamous dolly zoom stretches the background to seem as if the door is much farther away from the character than it actually is. On the other hand, the dolly-out/zoom-in shot shrinks the background to seem much closer than it really is.

Other Notable Examples 
In the 1975 film, Jaws, the infamous Get Out Of The Water scene contains a dolly zoom that focuses on Martin Brody’s shocking realization of a shark on the beach.

In the 1990 film, Good Fellas, Martin Scorsese used dolly zooms to convey tension between characters. This was most famously used in Henry's dive into paranoia, where he eats at a diner with Jimmy while tracking a window to see if anybody has been following him.

In the 2001 film, The Lord of the Rings: The Fellowship of the Ring, Frodo standbys as a dolly zoom signifies an entrance of an enemy from the woods.

In the 2004 film, Shaun of the Dead, a dolly zoom places comedic emphasis on Shaun’s bravery that ultimately fails when his shotgun jams.  

In the 2007 film, Ratatouille, the food critic has an intense flashback, signified through a dolly zoom, towards his childhood days after eating Remy’s ratatouille. Throughout the film, dolly zooms are used extensively to highlight bonding between two characters, such as when Remy feels a personal connection with Chef Gusteau on the television.

Optics 

For most purposes, it can be assumed that the image space and the object space are in the same medium. Thus, for an object in focus, the distance between the lens and image plane , the distance between lens and the object , and the focal length  are related by

Then the transverse magnification is

For an object of finite depth, one can conceive of the average axial magnification as the ratio of the depth of the image and the depth of the object:

One can see that if magnification remains constant, a longer focal length results in a smaller axial magnification, and a smaller focal length in a larger axial magnification. That is, when using a longer focal length while moving the camera/lens away from the object to maintain the same magnification M, objects seem shallower, and the axial distances between objects seem shorter. The opposite—increased axial magnification—happens with shorter focal lengths while moving the camera/lens towards the object.

Calculating distances

To achieve the effect, the camera needs to be positioned at a certain distance from the object that is supposed to remain still during the dolly zoom. The distance depends on how wide the scene is to be filmed and on the field of view (FOV) of the camera lens. Before calculating the distances needed at the different fields of view, the constant width of the scene has to be calculated:

For example, a FOV of 90° and a distance of 2 meters yield a constant width of 4 meters, allowing a 4-meter-wide object to remain still inside the frame during the effect.

References

Special effects
Cinematography
Cinematic techniques
Articles containing video clips
Alfred Hitchcock
Television terminology
Film and video terminology